Flammende Herzen (“Blazing Heart” in English) is the debut studio album by the German solo artist Michael Rother. It was released in 1977 and includes the single "Flammende Herzen" b/w "Karussell". The music was used the following year to soundtrack Flaming Hearts. It was Rother's first solo venture after having recorded five albums prior as a member of Neu! with Klaus Dinger and Harmonia with Hans-Joachim Roedelius and Dieter Moebius.

The album was recorded between June and September 1976 in Germany at Conny's Studio. Receiving positive reviews the album was released as an LP in March 1977 before it was re-released by Polydor in 1982. The album was reissued on CD in 1990, before being re-issued again in 1993 with bonus tracks and having been remastered. The artwork for the album was designed by Rike with photography by Christian Rabe and Ann.

Recording and music
Following the disbandment of Neu! having released their third studio album Neu! '75 in 1975, Rother worked again with Neu! and Harmonia producer Conny Plank on his first solo album. Jaki Liebezeit from Can augmented Rother on drums. Aside from Liebezeit, the entirety of the album was written and performed by Rother utilising guitar, bass guitar, electric piano, organ, synthesizer and electronic percussion. In contrast to Rother's work with his former groups, the album was completely instrumental and instead he performs the majority of the melodies using his guitar.

On completion of the sessions Rother re-united with Cluster members Hans-Joachim Roedelius and Dieter Moebius and former-Roxy Music member and solo artist Brian Eno to record a third Harmonia album in Forst in 1976. The studio sessions were productive but the recordings were left unreleased until November 1997 when they were released as Tracks and Traces and credited to 'Harmonia 76'.

Releases
Flammende Herzen was first released on Sky Records as an LP in 1977. The album has been re-released several times, again as an LP on Polydor after Rother joined the label in 1982, then as a CD on Polygram in 1990. In 1993, Rother secured the rights to his back catalogue and re-issued all of his solo albums with bonus tracks and remastered sound on his own label, Random Records. In 2000, Rother re-issued all of the albums again in partnership between Random Records and BSC Music. Expanded editions include two versions of the title track recorded in the 1990s, "Vorbei (Flammende Herzen - Chill Remix 1993)" and "Flammende Herzen - Film Remix 1993" with Joachim Rudolph on drums, bass, and co-remixing. The album has since been released in the US on Water Records and as a heavyweight 180 gram LP on the 4 Men With Beards imprint.

Reception

Flammende Herzen received positive reviews by the majority of critics.

Track listing

Personnel
 Michael Rother - Guitar, Electric Piano, Bass, Synthesizer, Organ, Electric Percussion, Producer
 Jaki Liebezeit - Drums
 Conny Plank - Producer, Engineering
 Ann Weitz - Front Cover Photograph
 Christian Rabe - Back Photo
 Rike - Design

References

1977 debut albums
Albums produced by Conny Plank
Michael Rother albums